The 1991 Weber State Wildcats football team represented Weber State University as a member of the Big Sky Conference during the 1991 NCAA Division I-AA football season. Led by third-year head coach Dave Arslanian and junior quarterback Jamie Martin, the Wildcats compiled an overall record of 8–4 with a mark of6–2 in conference play, and a placing second in the Big Sky. Weber State advanced to the NCAA Division I-AA Football Championship playoffs for the second time in the program history, where they lost in the first round to Northern Iowa. Martin won the Walter Payton Award, given to the most outstanding offensive player in NCAA Division I-AA.

Schedule

References

Weber State
Weber State Wildcats football seasons
Weber State Wildcats football